Bernard Wolfman (July 8, 1924 – August 20, 2011) was the Dean of the University of Pennsylvania Law School as well as its Gemmill Professor of Tax Law and Tax Policy, and the Fessenden Professor of Law at Harvard Law School.

Biography

Wolfman was born in Philadelphia, Pennsylvania, to Nathan and Elizabeth (Coff) Wolfman, and was Jewish. In the Second World War, in December 1944 he fought in Germany. He earned an A.B. in political science from the University of Pennsylvania in 1946, and a J.D. from the University of Pennsylvania Law School in 1948.

After graduation, he was a lawyer for 15 years at the firm of Wolf, Block, Schorr and Solis-Cohen in Philadelphia, from 1948 to 1963, and was the firm’s managing partner from 1961 to 1963.

In 1963 Wolfman started teaching at the University of Pennsylvania Law School. He was the law school’s Gemmill Professor of Tax Law and Tax Policy, and was Dean of the University of Pennsylvania Law School from 1970 to 1975. In 1976, he  became the Fessenden Professor of Law at Harvard Law School in 1976, holding that position until 2007. Wolfman was an expert in tax, ethics, and lawyers' professional responsibility.

Wolfman wrote a great number of articles and essays. His also authored four books, including Dissent Without Opinion: The Behavior of Justice William O. Douglas in Tax Cases (1975).

He received an honorary Doctor of Laws degree from the Jewish Theological Seminary of America in 1971, and an honorary Doctor of Laws degree from Capital University in 1990.

He was married first to Zelda Bernstein Wolfman, and after her death to Toni Wolfman, and had five children. Wolfman resided in Elkins Park, Pennsylvania, as he and his family attended Beth Sholom Congregation there, and Cambridge, Massachusetts. He died from heart failure at 87 years of age in West Orange, New Jersey.

References

External links
"IN MEMORIAM: BERNARD WOLFMAN," 125 Harvard Law Review 8 (June 2012)
United States Commission on Revision of the Federal Court Appellate System. "Testimony of Dean Bernard Wolfman, University of Pennsylvania Law School," Hearings Before the Commission on Revision of the Federal Court Appellate System: Second Phase, Persuant to Public Law 92-489 as Amended, Public Law 93-420, Volume 1, p. 85 (1975)

University of Pennsylvania Law School faculty
Deans of law schools in the United States
Deans of University of Pennsylvania Law School
Lawyers from Philadelphia
Lawyers from Cambridge, Massachusetts
2011 deaths
University of Pennsylvania School of Arts and Sciences alumni
University of Pennsylvania Law School alumni
Harvard Law School faculty
1924 births
American military personnel of World War II
Jewish American academics
Jewish American attorneys
Scholars of tax law
20th-century American lawyers
21st-century American Jews